C++23 is the informal name for the next version of the ISO/IEC 14882 standard for the C++ programming language that will follow C++20. The current draft is N4928.

In February 2020, at the final meeting for C++20 in Prague, an overall plan for C++23 was adopted: planned features for C++23 are library support for coroutines, a modular standard library, executors, and networking.

The first WG21 meeting focused on C++23 was intended to take place in Varna in early June 2020, but was cancelled due to the COVID-19 pandemic, as was the November 2020 meeting in New York and the February 2021 meeting in Kona, Hawaii. All meetings until November 2022 were virtual while the November 2022 meeting was hybrid.

New features 
In the absence of face-to-face WG21 meetings, few new features have so far been added to the C++23 draft. But the following were added after the virtual WG21 meeting of 9 November 2020, where they were approved by straw polls:
 Literal suffixes for std::size_t and the corresponding signed type
 A stacktrace library, based on Boost.Stacktrace
 A type trait 
 The header , for interoperability with C atomics

After the virtual WG21 meeting of 22 February 2021, following features are added where they were approved by straw polls:
 Removing unnecessary empty parameter list  from lambda expressions.
 Locks lock lockables.
 Conditionally borrowed ranges.
 .

After the summer 2021 ISO C++ standards plenary virtual meeting of June 2021, new features and defect reports were approved by straw polls:
 Consteval if.
 Allowing duplicate attributes.
 -based string-stream.
 Few changes of the ranges library:
 Removing  constraint from concept .
 .
 Adding default arguments for 's forwarding constructor.

After the autumn 2021 ISO C++ standards plenary virtual meeting of October 2021, new features and defect reports were approved by straw polls:
 Non-literal variables, labels, and gotos in  functions, but still ill-formed to evaluate them at compile-time.
 Explicit  object parameter.
 Changes on character sets and encodings.
Both directives were added to C23 (C language update) and GCC 12.
 Allowing alias declarations in init-statement.
 Overloading multidimensional subscript operator (e.g. ).
 Changes in text formatting library:
 Fixing locale handling in chrono formatters.
 Use of forwarding references in format arguments to allow -like types.
 Changes in ranges library:
 Refined definition of a view.
  range adaptor family:
 
 
  (and  being equivalent to )
  (and  being equivalent to )
 .
 Member function template .
 Printing  pointers.
 .
 Heterogeneous erasure overloads for associative containers.
 Revamped specification and use of integer-class types.
 Clarify C headers. "The headers are not useful in code that is only required to be valid C++. Therefore, the C headers should be provided by the C++ standard library as a fully-supported, not deprecated part, but they should also be discouraged for use in code that is not polyglot interoperability code. [..] This proposal makes the C headers no longer deprecated, so there is no formal threat of future removal. The effective discouragement to use the C headers in pure C++ code is now spelled out explicitly as normative discouragement."

After the virtual WG21 meeting of 7 February 2022, the following features are added where they were approved by straw polls:
 
  for cmath and cstdlib
 Function to mark unreachable code
 
 A type trait to detect reference binding to temporary
 Making  
 Pipe support for user-defined range adaptors
 ,  and 
 
 Windowing range adaptors:  and 
 

After the virtual WG21 meeting of 25 July 2022, the following features and defect reports are added where they were approved by straw polls:
 Made rewriting equality in expressions less of a breaking change.
 Reverted the deprecation of bitwise assignment to  variables.
 Added the  preprocessor directive.
 Removed non-encodable wide character literals and multicharacter wide character literals.
 Allowed labels to appear at the end of compound statements.
 Added escape sequences delimited with curly braces for octal and hexadecimal numbers and universal character names.
 Allowed  functions to never be constant expressions.
 Simplified some implicit move rules from C++20 and allowed implicit move when returning an rvalue reference.
 Add a way to specify unicode characters by name. For example, 
 Allowed operator  to be .
 Allowed the this pointer and references of unknown origin to appear in constant expressions.
 Allowed implementations to define extended floating-point types in addition to the three standard floating-point types. Added the type aliases std::float16_t, std::float32_t, std::float64_t, std::float128_t, std::bfloat16_t for these extended types accessible through the header <stdfloat>, their corresponding literal suffixes f16 f32 f64 f128 bf16or F16 F32 F64 F128 BF16 and added overloads to various standard library functions that take floats as arguments.
 Added the  attribute which allows the compiler to assume the provided expression is true to allow optimizations.
 Made support for UTF-8 source files mandatory, providing a portable encoding for source files.
 Removed the requirement that  can encode all characters of the extended character set, in effect allowing UTF-16 to be used for wide string literals.
 Added std::mdspan, a multidimensional array view analogous to std::span.
 Added support for exclusive mode fstreams, analogous to the "x" flag in fopen.
 Allowed std::format to handle Ranges.
 Made std::string::substr use move semantics.
 Added  which implements a coroutine generator that models 

After the hybrid WG21 meeting of 7 November 2022, the following features and defect reports are added where they were approved by straw polls:
 
 Allowed operator  to be .
 Allowed  and  variables to appear in  functions if they are usable in constant expressions.
  propagates upwards, that is, certain existing  functions become  functions when those functions can already only be invoked during compile time.
 Extended the lifetime of temporaries that appear in the for-range-initializer of a range-based  loop to cover the entire loop.
 Reverted the deprecation of (all, not just bitwise) compound assignment to  variables.

Removed and deprecated features 
 Removed the garbage collection support that was added in C++11, despite many GC implementations available for C++; "Garbage Collection in C++ is clearly useful for particular applications. However, Garbage Collection as specified by the Standard is not useful for those applications."
 Deprecate  and

References 

Algol programming language family
C++
C++ programming language family
High-level programming languages
Statically typed programming languages